Braeside Observatory  is a privately owned astronomical observatory previously owned and operated by Arizona State University.  It is located five miles west of Flagstaff, Arizona (US), near the U.S. Naval observatory. The observatory is made up of two buildings, the telescope building and the control building.  The telescope building is where the observatory's 16" Cassegrain Reflector telescope is housed.  The telescope is controlled from either the control building or from the university through computer controls.

History 
The observatory was founded in 1976 by Robert Fried, a retired Delta Air Lines captain, after a chance meeting with Sir Patrick Moore inspired him to turn his astronomical hobby into something more concrete. The observatory was set up as a private operating foundation.  After Mr. Fried's death in 2003, the university committed itself to keeping the observatory open as an educational and research facility.

In Spring 2010, the Braeside Observatory dome and telescope were sold to an out-of-state buyer, who removed the observatory from its Flagstaff home. Braeside Observatory thus no longer exists.

See also 
 List of observatories

References

External links
 Flagstaff Clear Sky Clock Forecasts of observing conditions covering Braeside Observatory.

Astronomical observatories in Arizona
Buildings and structures in Flagstaff, Arizona
Defunct astronomical observatories
1976 establishments in Arizona